Abha Narain Lambah (born 1970) is an Indian conservation architect whose eponymous architectural practice has restored several of India's UNESCO World Heritage Sites like the Ajanta Caves, Golconda Fort and Mahabodhi Temple, and Mumbai's Victorian buildings like the Crawford Market, Royal Opera House, Asiatic Society of Mumbai Town Hall and Knesset Eliyahoo Synagogue.

The firm's work has been recognised by 10 UNESCO Asia-Pacific Awards for Cultural Heritage Conservation. In 2007 her work of the Conservation of the Chamba Lakhang Buddha Temple in Basgo Ladakh won the Award of Excellence and the Convocation Hall Mumbai University the Award of Distinction UNESCO Asia Pacific Awards. In 2017, their restoration work on the Royal Opera House, India's only surviving opera house, was given the Award of Merit under the UNESCO Asia-Pacific Awards for Cultural Heritage Conservation.

Their ongoing projects are the restoration of the Mughal Garden of Shalimar Bagh Kashmir, Preparation of UNESCO Nomination for the Mughal Gardens of Kashmir; Sarnath Kashi and Rabindranath's Santiniketan and Management Plan for Le Corbusier's historic Chandigarh Capitol Complex in Punjab. 

Abha has been on the Expert Committee for the Rashtrapati Bhavan Museum and Mentor Indian Museum Kolkata. The practice has over the last 25 years, focused on museum projects across the country that include Chhatrapati Shivaji Maharaj Vastu Sangrahalaya Mumbai, Chowmahalla Palace Museum Hyderabad, Jaivilas Palace Museum Gwalior, Lalbagh Palace Museum Indore, Bharatpur Museum, Jaipur Metro Museum, Anand Bhavan Allahabad, Nehru Memorial Library & Museum Delhi, Mani Bhavan Gandhi Sangrahalaya Mumbai and Russia’s oldest museum, the Kunstkamera. She is currently working on the Museums of Freedom & Kashmir at Delhi’s Red Fort Delhi, Balasaheb Thackeray Rashtriya Smarak and Alpaiwala Museum of the Parsis. She serves on the Governing Council INTACH and was Jury Chair – ADC Awards New York and juror Golden Trezzini Awards.

Early life

Lambah was born in Calcutta (now Kolkata) and grew up in Ballygunge. She attended the Loreto House school and then graduated from the School of Planning and Architecture, New Delhi.

Career
Lambah set up her architectural practice in 1996. Her first project was to finalise urban signage and street furniture guidelines for Dadabhai Naoroji Road, along which many of the city's Gothic Revival and Neoclassical buildings are located. In 2000, she became a conservation consultant to Rahul Mehrotra Associates, who were restoring the Chowmahalla Palace in Hyderabad. Between 2004 and 2006, she worked on the 15th-century Basgo Monastery and restored the Maitreya Buddha. Since 2010, she has restored many of Mumbai's Victorian, Neo-Gothic and Indo-Saracenic buildings, such as the Municipal Corporation Building, Crawford Market, Prince of Wales Museum, Convocation Hall, University of Mumbai, Knesset Eliyahoo Synagogue, Mumbai. Lambah has acknowledged the influence of Joseph Allen Stein and Charles Correa on her practice.

Honours
 Eisenhower Fellowship (2002)
 Award of Merit, UNESCO Asia-Pacific Awards for Cultural Heritage Conservation (2017) - Royal Opera House (Mumbai)
 Honourable Mention, UNESCO Asia-Pacific Awards for Cultural Heritage Conservation (2010) - Chhatrapati Shivaji Maharaj Vastu Sangrahalaya.

See also 

 Vikas Dilawari
 Bruno Souza (architect)

Books

References

External links

Living people
1970 births
21st-century Indian architects
School of Planning and Architecture, New Delhi alumni
People from Kolkata
Indian women architects
Indian architects
Conservation architects
Indian women designers
UNESCO Asia-Pacific Heritage Awards winners